The women's hammer throw event at the 2004 African Championships in Athletics was held in Brazzaville, Republic of the Congo on July 17.

Results

References
Results

2004 African Championships in Athletics
Hammer throw at the African Championships in Athletics
2004 in women's athletics